Norman Cherrington (birth registered fourth ¼ 1935  – 2 December 2010) was an English professional rugby league footballer who played in the 1950s and 1960s.

Background
Cherrington's birth was registered in Wigan district, England.

Playing career

International honours
Norman Cherrington won a cap for England while at Wigan in 1956 against France, and won a cap for Great Britain while at Wigan in 1960 against France.

County League appearances
Norman Cherrington played in Wigan's victories in the Lancashire County League during the 1958–59 season and 1961–62 season.

Challenge Cup Final appearances
Norman Cherrington played left-, i.e. number 11, in Wigan's 13–9 victory over Workington Town in the 1958 Challenge Cup Final during the 1957–58 season at Wembley Stadium, London on Saturday 10 May 1958, in front of a crowd of 66,109, and played right-, i.e. number 12, in the 30-13 victory over Hull F.C. in the 1959 Challenge Cup Final during the 1958–59 season at Wembley Stadium, London on Saturday 9 May 1959, in front of a crowd of 79,811.

County Cup Final appearances
Norman Cherrington played left-, i.e. number 11, in Wigan's 8-13 defeat by Oldham in the 1957 Lancashire County Cup Final during the 1957–58 season at Station Road, Swinton on Saturday 19 October 1957.

Funeral
Norman Cherrington's funeral took place at Wigan Parish Church at 12.30pm on Tuesday 14 December 2010.

References

External links
Statistics at thisiswarrington.co.uk
Statistics at wigan.rlfans.com

1935 births
2010 deaths
England national rugby league team players
English rugby league players
Great Britain national rugby league team players
Huddersfield Giants players
Rugby league players from Wigan
Place of death missing
Rugby league second-rows
Rugby league utility players
Rugby league wingers
Warrington Wolves players
Wigan Warriors players